A land-attack missile (LAM) is a naval  surface-to-surface missile that is capable of effectively attacking targets ashore, unlike specialized anti-ship missiles, which are optimized for striking other ships. Some dual-role missiles are suitable for both missions.

Like long-range anti-ship missiles, land-attack missiles are usually turbojet or turbofan powered cruise missiles. To prevent early detection and counter-measures, they usually fly near the ground at very low altitude, employing terrain-following techniques, either with terrain-following radar or with precise navigation system, like GPS, combined with a stored map of obstacles and ground elevation data (TERCOM).

Land-attack missiles are usually programmed before launch to follow a set of waypoints up to the target. Terminal guidance can be done with active radar homing, passive radar or Electronic warfare support measures, infrared homing or optical guidance, or the (fixed) target was predesignated with as final waypoint.

Some missiles allow mid-course updates after launch and some may even send information back to the launch platform or other units.

List of missiles

References

Naval weapons